Templewo  is a village in the administrative district of Gmina Bledzew, within Międzyrzecz County, Lubusz Voivodeship, in western Poland.

Nearby the village are the remains of a Cold War Soviet Union nuclear military base.

References

Templewo